Bradley John Thomas (born 18 January 1972 in Hobart, Tasmania) is an Australian cricket player, who played a single first-class match and 3 List-A matches for Tasmania in 2001–02.

Brad Thomas is a good middle-order allrounder, who has consistently been amongst the top performing players in the Tasmanian Grade Cricket competition playing for University of Tasmania Cricket Club.

See also
 List of Tasmanian representative cricketers

External links 
Cricinfo profile

1972 births
Living people
Australian cricketers
Tasmania cricketers
Australian cricket coaches